Eubanks is a surname. Notable people with the surname include:

 Austin Eubanks, American public speaker and expert on drug-addiction and recovery
Bob Eubanks, American game show host
Chris Eubank, British boxer, born Christopher Livingstone Eubanks
Christopher Eubanks, American tennis player
David Eubanks, American Restoration Movement preacher
Drew Eubanks, American basketball player
Gordon Eubanks, American computer industry executive
J.J. Eubanks (born 1968), American basketball player, scored 101 points during an Israeli league game, was the top scorer in the 1994-95 Israel Basketball Premier League.
John Eubanks, American football player
Jordan Eubanks, reality show participant
Kevin Eubanks, American musician
Kristin Eubanks, American wrestler
Nick Eubanks (born 1996), American football player
Rachael A. Eubanks, American treasurer
Ray E. Eubanks, American Medal of Honor recipient
Robin Eubanks, American trombonist
Sijara Eubanks, American mixed martial artist
Uel Eubanks, American baseball player